The Bedded Range is a mountain range in the Hozameen Range subdivision of the Canadian Cascades, which are the extension of the Cascade Range into British Columbia, Canada.  Located between the Coquihalla and Tulameen Rivers, the Bedded Range is a dioritic plug related to the Chilliwack batholith.

Ecology
A diverse flora and fauna exist in the Bedded Range. Fauna include mammals, amphibians and birds. In the case of amphibians, one of the species present is the Rough-skinned newt, Taricha granulosa, whose populations exhibit an adult perennibranchiate form in approximately 90 percent of the population.

References
 Fred W. Beckey. 1995. Cascade Alpine Guide: Rainy Pass to Fraser River, Published by The Mountaineers Books,
 C. Michael Hogan. 2008. Rough-skinned Newt (Taricha granulosa), Globaltwitcher, ed. Nicklas Stromberg

Line notes

Mountain ranges of British Columbia
Canadian Cascades